Sartre Studies International is a journal published by Berghahn Books in association with the United Kingdom Sartre Society and North American Sartre Society, and focuses on the philosophical, literary and political issues originating in existentialism, and explores the continuing vitality of existentialist and Sartrean ideas in contemporary society and culture. Each issue contains a reviews section and a notice board of current events, such as conferences, publications and media broadcasts linked to Jean Paul Sartre's life, work and intellectual legacy.
It is edited conjointly by John Gillespie, Katherine Morris, John Ireland, Constance Mui.

Indexing / Abstracting 

Sartre Studies International is indexed/abstracted in:

External links 
Sartre Studies International

Journals about philosophers
Works about existentialism
Publications established in 1997
Biannual journals
Berghahn Books academic journals
English-language journals